Babayev or Babaev is a Russian, Ukrainian, Turkmen, Uzbek and Azerbaijani masculine surname that is slavicised from Turkic languages; its feminine form is Babayeva or Babaeva. The word babay (бабай) means "grandfather" or "old man" in Tatar and Bashkir. Alternatively, it comes from Arabic word "bab", which means "door". There was a name "Babullah" which meant "doorway of God" or "doorway to heaven". It was very popular among Turkic nations before Soviet times. Grandchildren of "Babs" were sometimes given "Babayev" as a surname. It was initially "Babov", but later it became "Babayev" due to the influence of Russian phonetics. The surname may refer to:

Alaviyya Babayeva (1921–2014), Azerbaijani prose-writer, translator of contemporary Russian literature, and publicist
 Aleksandr Babayev (1923–1985), flying ace
 Arif Babayev, Azerbaijani film director 
 Artour "Arteezy" Babaev (1996–present), Uzbek-Canadian professional Dota 2 player
 Chingiz Babayev (1964–1995) Azerbaijani officer
 Eli Babayev, Israeli football player
 Etibar Babayev (born 1950) Azerbaijani journalist,
 Farid Babayev (died 2007), Russian politician
 Firuddin Babayev (1929—1987), Azerbaijani scientist
 Heydar Babayev (born 1957), Azerbaijani politician
 Kasymguly Babaýew (born 1966), Turkmen politician
 Mirza Babayev (1913–2003), Azerbaijani movie actor and singer
 Nazim Babayev (born 1997), Azerbaijani track and field athlete
 Oleh Babayev (1965–2014), Ukrainian politician
 Rafig Babayev (1937–1994), Azerbaijani jazz composer and pianist
Sabina Babayeva (born 1979), Azerbaijani singer
 Sukhan Babayev (1910–1995), First Secretary of the Communist Party of Turkmenistan in 1951–1958
Vladlen Babayev (born 1996), Russian football player 
 Volodymyr Babayev (born 1952), Ukrainian scholar and politician

References

Azerbaijani-language surnames
Russian-language surnames
Uzbek-language surnames
Turkic-language surnames
Patronymic surnames